Chadd Cassidy (born August 3, 1973) is an American professional ice hockey coach and current head coach of the Cape Breton Eagles in the Quebec Major Junior Hockey League. 

Cassidy played varsity hockey at the State University of New York at Cortland, graduating in 1995 with a degree in recreation and leisure studies. He served as an assistant coach at Cortland State from 1999 to 2001, and then at the State University of New York at Potsdam for the 2001–02 season. His next stop was with the National Sports Academy in Lake Placid, New York where he was the head coach from 2002 to 2006, with his team winning the league championship in 2004. Next, Cassidy was an assistant coach under Ron Rolston with the U.S. National Under-18 Team from 2006 to 2011.

On August 31, 2011, Cassidy joined the Rochester Americans as an assistant coach, and on February 20, 2013, he took over as head coach when Ron Rolston was promoted to coach the Buffalo Sabres. He was relieved of his duties as head coach on May 1, 2015.

He then became the head coach at Northwood School in Lake Placid, New York, from 2015 to 2021. In July 2021, he was named the head coach of the Omaha Lancers in the United States Hockey League, but resigned in November 2021 over concerns of the operations of the team.

Cassidy was named the head coach of the Cape Breton Eagles on January 7, 2022, and the eighth head coach in the franchise's history in Cape Breton.

References

External links
Chadd Cassidy's team staff history at EliteProspects.com

1973 births
Living people
American ice hockey coaches
Rochester Americans coaches
State University of New York at Cortland alumni
State University of New York at Cortland faculty
State University of New York at Potsdam faculty
People from Lake Placid, New York
Ice hockey coaches from New York (state)